is the prefecture song of Nagano Prefecture, Japan, created for educational purposes. Because of its popular appearance in public areas such as train stations and TV programs, a large segment of the prefecture's population can remember the song. Sometimes the song is used (half jestingly) to test one's patriotism to the region. The song was played during the opening ceremony of the 1998 Winter Olympics to accompany the Parade of Nations.

The song was created in 1900, and was officially designated as Nagano's prefectural song on 20 May 1968.

The lyrics are divided into sections as follows:
An overview of the geography of Nagano Prefecture
mountains and rivers
industry
Historic Site/Scenic Beauty
Notable people from Nagano
Usui Pass and the railway (Shinetsu Main Line opened several years before the composition), concluding

See also

List of Prefecture songs of Japan

References

1900 songs
Culture in Nagano Prefecture
Japanese-language songs
Japanese prefecture songs
1900 establishments in Japan